Alaska State Troopers is an American documentary television series that airs on National Geographic Channel and premiered on October 14, 2009. It is narrated by Marc Graue. The show follows the daily beats of various bureaus within the Alaska State Troopers. In addition, the show features segments that follow village public safety officers from small rural villages as well as officers from other cities such as Wasilla, Palmer, Anchorage, and Soldotna.

The show follows the exploits of a number of officers from all regions of the state. Troopers who are seen on the show include James and Anne Sears, Howie Peterson, Jon Simeon and Brent Johnson, Scott Quist, Odean Hall, Lonny Piscoya, Luis Nieves, Dan Dahl, Rick Roberts, Abraham Garcia, Dan Cox, Gabe Rich, Michael Munson, Jonathan Stroebele, Joshua Varys, JJ Hennessey, Melvin Colley, Ken Van Spronsen, Daron Cooper, Lance Ewers, Jared Noll, Terrence Shanigan, Blake Calhoun, Brandon Viator, Tony Wegrzyn, William Connors, Jimmy Buttrey, Kamau Leigh, and Garrett Frost.

Although the show is aired in many countries, the National Geographic Channel has so far not released DVDs of the series outside of the United States.

The fifth season premiered on September 15, 2013. The sixth season premiered on April 10, 2014. After a total of 8 seasons the series was not continued, because "It was just time to focus on the job of providing public safety without any added outside distractions".

Officers from the program who have died in the line of duty

On March 30, 2013, two troopers featured in the program were killed in a helicopter crash during a search and rescue (SAR) mission near Talkeetna. Tage Brandel Toll and pilot Mel Nading were killed when they were returning with a rescued snowmobiler. The snowmobiler also died in the crash.

In 2014, the NTSB concluded the accident was caused by pilot error, and the Alaska DPS and the Alaska state troopers' safety culture. The department had been neglecting the issues in the lack of training for both the pilot and observer. And the error of the pilot was to fly into the severely bad weather which he was not adequately trained for.

On May 1, 2014, two troopers featured in the program were shot and killed in Tanana, a small town in Alaska's interior. The officers were reported to be Trooper Gabriel "Gabe" Rich (26) and Sgt. Patrick "Scott" Johnson (45).

A 19-year-old man, Nathanial "Sach" Kangas, was arrested in connection with the shootings. Troopers had responded to the town after the local village public safety officer (VPSO) requested back up in an earlier incident involving the father of the shooting suspect. In addition to the murder charges against his son, the elder Kangas was arrested and charged with assaulting the VPSO, and for driving with a suspended license the previous day.

To the date of writing, 4 officers who have participated in the show have been killed in the line of duty.

Episodes

Season 1 (2009)

Season 2 (2011)

Season 3 (2011-12)

Season 4 (2012-13)

Season 5 (2013)

Season 6 (2014)

Season 7 (2015)

References

External links
 Official website
 Alaska State Troopers on IMDB

2000s American documentary television series
2010s American documentary television series
2009 American television series debuts
2015 American television series endings
2000s American crime television series
2010s American crime television series
Television shows set in Alaska
National Geographic (American TV channel) original programming
Alaska Department of Public Safety